Durham is a town in Strafford County, New Hampshire, United States. The population was 15,490 at the 2020 census, up from 14,638 at the 2010 census. Durham is home to the University of New Hampshire.

The primary settlement in the town, where 11,147 people resided at the 2020 census, is defined by the U.S. Census Bureau as the Durham census-designated place (CDP) and includes the densely populated portion of the town centered on the intersection of New Hampshire Route 108 and Main Street, which includes the university that dominates the town.

History 

Durham sits beside Great Bay at the mouth of the Oyster River, an ideal location for people who lived close to the land, like the Western Abenaki and their ancestors who've lived in the region for an estimated 11,000 years. The Shankhassick (now Oyster) River provided shellfish and access to the north woods for hunting and trapping; the sea provided food and access to long-established trade routes between tribes both north and south; and the open meadows provided land easy to cultivate for crops. Wecannecohunt (or Wecohamet), as the settlement was known until English settlers arrived, proved immediately attractive to them, too. 

English settlers first colonized the region in 1622 when King James I granted Sir Fernandino Gorges and John Mason "all that part or porcon of that country now commonly called New-England," including every island within 100 miles of the coast and "all the lands, soyle, grounds, havens, ports, rivers, mines, ... minerals, pearls and pretious stones, woods, queries, marshes waters, fishings, hunting, hawking, fowling, commodities and hereditaments whatsoever." Gorges and Mason agreed to split the vast tract along the Piscataqua River (still known by its Abenaki name pesgatak was, for "the water looks dark"). Gorges took the tract to the east and named it Maine. Mason took the land to west and named it New Hampshire. The region was first named "N'dakinna". It is the traditional ancestral homeland of the Abenaki, Pennacook and Wabanaki peoples.

Colonists first arrived in Wecannecohunt in 1622, the year of the Gorges-Mason grant. They spent their earliest years fishing, cutting, and trapping to sell salted fish, lumber, and fur to European markets. By 1633, colonists were spread along the tidal shores of the Oyster River, and by 1640, they were "in 'recognized possession' of lands up to the fall line." Colonial Durham was first known as the Oyster River Plantation.  The English settlers brought non-native livestock aboard their ships, "thousands of cattle, swine, sheep, and horses," requiring them to clear acres merely for pasture. Wecannecohunt's fields, carefully cultivated across centuries, were trampled and their crops destroyed. "The animals exacerbated a host of problems related to subsistence practices, land use, property rights and, ultimately, political authority." When violence between the colonized and the colonizers erupted, livestock were frequently killed. The Abenaki saw them as a direct threat to their food supply.

During King William's War, on July 18, 1694, the fledgling English colonial settlement was attacked in the Raid on Oyster River by French career soldier Claude-Sébastien de Villieu with about 250 Abenaki from Norridgewock under command of their sagamore Bomazeen (or Bomoseen). In all, 104 inhabitants were killed and 27 taken captive, with half the dwellings, including the garrisons, pillaged and burned to the ground.

Oyster River was part of Dover throughout its first century. The Plantation was granted rights as an independent parish in 1716 and incorporated as a township in 1732 when it was renamed Durham. Rev. Hugh Adams claimed to have proposed the name "Durham" in an address to the General Assembly in 1738. Two of the earliest settlers of Dover were William and Edward Hilton, the direct descendants of Sir William de Hilton, Lord of Hilton Castle in County Durham, England, but there is nothing to prove that Durham was named in their honor.

Benjamin Thompson, a descendant of an early settler, bequeathed his assets and family estate, Warner Farm, to the state for the establishment of an agricultural college. Founded in 1866 in Hanover, the New Hampshire College of Agriculture and the Mechanic Arts moved to Durham in 1893 and became the University of New Hampshire in 1923. Thompson Hall, built in 1892 with an iconic clock tower, is named in his honor. Designed in the Romanesque Revival style by the Concord architectural firm of Dow & Randlett, it was listed on the National Register of Historic Places in 1996.

On October 22, 1999, Durham was the site of a debate between Republican candidates in the 2000 Presidential Election. Future president George W. Bush was present, along with other notable Republicans of the era, such as John McCain, Alan Keyes, Steve Forbes, and Gary Bauer. The debate became the subject of a skit on Saturday Night Live which featured Darrell Hammond playing then President Bill Clinton.

In 2017, Durham became the first community in New Hampshire to recognize Indigenous Peoples' Day in place of Columbus Day. In 2018, the Oyster River Cooperative School District, which includes Durham, Lee and Madbury, adopted Indigenous Peoples' Day on its school calendar.

Libraries

Over the years the people of Durham have created several libraries:

Durham Social Library (1815–1857): This library was incorporated by act of the New Hampshire Legislature in 1815. The library contained several hundred books and had a membership numbering nearly 50.

Durham Agricultural Library (1862–1881): Formed Feb. 3, 1862, with Benjamin Thompson as president, this library was small (approximately 72 books) and vocationally-based.

Durham Social Library (1881–1892): Organized March 9, 1881, the library had a membership of 80 and several hundred books. In 1883 the Richardson house was purchased to house the library. It eventually merged with the Durham Public Library.

Durham Public Library (1892–1906): Established in 1892 through the provisions of a New Hampshire state act, this was the town's first "public" library. It contained more than 3,500 books and eventually merged with the library of the New Hampshire College of Agriculture and the Mechanic Arts.
 
Library of the New Hampshire College of Agriculture and the Mechanic Arts (1893–): Came to Durham with the arrival of the College in 1893. Initially, the College housed the library in a single room in Thompson Hall. In 1900 Hamilton Smith gave the University $10,000 to construct a library, another $20,000 was obtained from Andrew Carnegie. In 1907—a year after the town and the college agreed to merge their collective library resources—the building (Hamilton Smith Hall) was completed.

Dimond Library (1958): The construction of a new building on the University of New Hampshire's campus brought a new library into the modern age. Recognizable columns such as at the Hamilton Smith Hall were replace with bolder designs that allowed the library to look more towards the future for inspiration. 

In March 1997 by a margin of 2–1, Durham voters passed a charter amendment to establish a Board of Trustees and allow plans for a new library to go forward. In July 1997 a temporary space was found for the new Public Library in a storefront between the dollar store and a pizzeria. Under the guidance of the Trustees and a newly formed Friends of the Library group, many volunteer townspeople come forward to sheetrock, paint, assemble shelves, and unpack and shelve 719 boxes of books. On July 21, 1997 a dedication ceremony was held for the new library, with Governor Jeanne Shaheen as the keynote speaker. It was the first new public library to be established in New Hampshire in almost a century. In July 2013 a new public library building was completed on Madbury Road.

Police department
A police force of some manner has served Durham since at least 1848. Durham Police Department is made up of 20 full-time and part-time officers and provides service 24-hours a day.

The Police Department's Adopt-A-Cop program was instituted in 1999 to improve relationships between University of New Hampshire fraternities. Each fraternity is assigned a police officer who attends house meetings and events and acts a liaison between the fraternity and the community.

Fire department and EMS 
The first fire department organization in Durham was organized in 1927 and the first salaried firefighter was employed in 1934.

The Durham Fire Department is one of the few fire departments in the country that is funded by both a municipality and a university.

In addition, McGregor Memorial EMS is a regional, non-profit organization delivering emergency medical services and education to the New Hampshire Seacoast area since 1968.

Geography
The town is drained by the Oyster River. Durham lies fully within the Piscataqua River (coastal) watershed.

Adjacent municipalities
 Madbury, New Hampshire (north)
 Dover, New Hampshire (northeast)
 Newington, New Hampshire (east)
 Newmarket, New Hampshire (south)
 Lee, New Hampshire (west)

Transportation
Amtrak's Downeaster train provides five round trips daily through Durham–UNH station, with service north to Portland, Freeport, and Brunswick, Maine, and south to Boston's North Station.

Climate

According to the Köppen Climate Classification system, Durham has a warm-summer humid continental climate, abbreviated "Dfb" on climate maps.

Demographics

The demographics of the town of Durham are strongly influenced by the presence of the campus of the University of New Hampshire. As of the census of 2010, there were 14,638 people, 2,960 households, and 1,544 families residing in the town. There were 3,092 housing units, of which 132, or 4.3%, were vacant. 7,266 town residents lived in group quarters such as dormitories, rather than in households. The racial makeup of the town was 93.8% white, 0.9% African American, 0.1% Native American, 3.2% Asian, 0.01% Native Hawaiian or Pacific Islander, 0.4% some other race, and 1.6% from two or more races. 2.0% of the population were Hispanic or Latino of any race.

Of the 2,960 households, 23.0% had children under the age of 18 living with them, 45.8% were headed by married couples living together, 4.4% had a female householder with no husband present, and 47.8% were non-families. 25.2% of all households were made up of individuals, and 10.2% were someone living alone who was 65 years of age or older. The average household size was 2.49, and the average family size was 2.94.

In the town, 8.6% of the population were under the age of 18, 64.3% were from 18 to 24, 7.7% from 25 to 44, 12.5% from 45 to 64, and 6.9% were 65 years of age or older. The median age was 21.0 years. For every 100 females, there were 85.7 males. For every 100 females age 18 and over, there were 83.5 males.

For the period 2011–2015, the estimated median annual income for a household was $71,190, and the median income for a family was $120,039. Male full-time workers had a median income of $72,197 versus $58,750 for females. The per capita income for the town was $22,650. 24.5% of the population and 1.4% of families were below the poverty line. 0.7% of the population under the age of 18 and 5.1% of those 65 or older were living in poverty.

Notable people 

 Jack Edwards (born 1957), play-by-play announcer for the Boston Bruins
 Daniel Ford (born 1931), writer
 Sam Fuld (born 1981), outfielder in Major League Baseball during 2007–2015, General Manager of the Philadelphia Phillies from 2020–present
 Louise Janin (1893–1997), painter
 Manuela Lutze (born 1974), four-time Olympic rower, two-time Olympic gold medalist
 Joyce Maynard (born 1953), writer
 Hercules Mooney (1715–1800), lieutenant colonel in the U.S. Revolutionary War
 Don Murray (1924–2006), journalist
 Deron Quint (born 1976), defenseman with six NHL teams
 Alexander Scammell (1747–1781), colonel of the 3rd New Hampshire Regiment
 Daniel C. Stillson (1826–1899), inventor of the Stillson pipe wrench

 John Sullivan (1740–1795), Revolutionary War general
 Ben Sulsky (born 1987), professional poker player
 Benjamin Thompson (1806–1890), farmer, businessman and benefactor of U.N.H.

Sites of interest 
 Durham Historic Association & Museum
New Hampshire Historical Marker No. 8: Site of Piscataqua Bridge
New Hampshire Historical Marker No. 50: Oyster River Massacre
New Hampshire Historical Marker No. 89: Major General John Sullivan, 1740–1795
New Hampshire Historical Marker No. 154: Packer's Falls

Gallery

References

Further reading
 
 The Great Massacre of 1694: Understanding the Destruction of Oyster River Plantation via Wayback Machine

External links 
 
 New Hampshire Economic and Labor Market Information Bureau Profile
 University of New Hampshire

 
Populated places established in 1732
Towns in Strafford County, New Hampshire
Towns in New Hampshire